The Brown Bears men's ice hockey team is a National Collegiate Athletic Association (NCAA) Division I college ice hockey program that represents Brown University. The Bears are a member of ECAC Hockey. They play at the Meehan Auditorium in Providence, Rhode Island.

History

The men's ice hockey team at Brown is one of the country's oldest programs, having played their first game in 1898. That season, the team helped to form the first informal conference, the Intercollegiate Hockey Association, and wound up winning the league championship. While there was no formal declaration at the time, Brown's title is sometimes referred to as the first ice hockey national championship. Brown nearly repeated the feat three years later but ultimately fell to Yale in the first two playoff games ever contested for college ice hockey.

The program swiftly declined after that near miss and the Bears became one of the worst teams in the nation. By 1906 the team had lost 16 straight contests, failing to score a goal in 9 games during that stretch. The program suspended operations after 1906 and remained shuttered for 20 years. When they returned to the ice they debuted with their first official head coach. Though James Gardner only lasted one season behind the bench the team performed much better with a hand at the tiller and quickly built up to be a respected program. In 1939 the team again suspended operations, though this time it was due to the onset of World War II. Brown's team remained out of commission for the entire duration of the war and didn't return until several years after its conclusion, finally hitting the ice again in 1947. 

In only 4 years the team climbed all the way to 17–5 record, receiving the top eastern seed for the 1951 NCAA tournament. Though they ultimately fell in the title game, Brown had become one of the better teams in college hockey and, excluding a brief period in the early '60s, would remain so for the next 30 years. When the 1980s rolled around the Bears results started turning sour and Brown found itself looking up at the rest of college hockey. Since 1981 Brown has produced only six winning seasons and more than half of their campaigns have ended with single-digit win totals. The Bears had a brief resurgence in the mid-1990s, managing to make the tournament in 1993 but bowed out after only 1 game.

Season-by-season results

All-time coaching records

As of the completion of 2022–23 season

Brown Olympians
Brown has sent five members of its team to the Olympics. Three former players, Donald Whiston (Silver, 1952), Robert Gaudreau (1968) and Mike Mastrullo (1984 and 1992) represented their respective nations as players, former player Tim Bothwell was an assistant coach on the gold medal-winning 2006 Canadian women's team and former assistant coach Jack Ferreira was an assistant GM for the US men's team in 1998.

Awards and honors

US Hockey Hall of Fame
James Fullerton (1992)

NCAA

Individual awards

Spencer Penrose Award
James Fullerton: 1965

Derek Hines Unsung Hero Award
Jordan Pietrus: 2010
Bobby Farnham: 2012

NCAA Tournament Most Outstanding Player
Donald Whiston: 1951

All-Americans
First Team

1950–51: Donald Whiston, G
1951–52: Bob Wheeler, F
1964–65: Robert Gaudreau, D
1965–66: Robert Gaudreau, D
1967–68: Wayne Small, F
1969–70: Curt Bennett, F
1972–73: Keith Smith, D
1974–75: Bill Gilligan, F
1977–78: Mike Laycock, G
1979–80: Mark Holden, G
1991–92: Mike Brewer, D
2003–04: Yann Danis, G

Second Team

1989–90: Chris Harvey, G
2001–02: Yann Danis, G

ECAC Hockey

Individual awards

ECAC Hockey Player of the Year
Wayne Small: 1967–68
Yann Danis: 2003–04

ECAC Hockey Rookie of the Year
Geoff Finch: 1990–91
Brian Ihnacak: 2003–04

Tim Taylor Award
Bob Gaudet: 1994–95

ECAC Hockey Outstanding Defenseman
Robert Gaudreau: 1965–66

ECAC Hockey Best Defensive Defenseman
Mike Traggio: 1993–94, 1994–95
Scott Ford: 2003–04
Dennis Robertson: 2013–14

Ken Dryden Award
Yann Danis: 2003–04

All-ECAC
First Team

1963–64: Leon Bryant, F
1964–65: Robert Gaudreau, D
1965–66: Robert Gaudreau, D
1966–67: Wayne Small, F
1967–68: Wayne Small, F
1969–70: Curt Bennett, F
1976–77: Tim Bothwell, D
1977–78: Mike Laycock, G
1989–90: Mike Brewer, D
1991–92: Mike Brewer, D
1993–94: Geoff Finch, G
1994–95: Mike Traggio, D
1997–98: Damian Prescott, F
2003–04: Yann Danis, G
2015–16: Nick Lappin, F

Second Team

1962–63: Leon Bryant, F
1963–64: Robert Gaudreau, D; Terry Chapman, F
1964–65: Terry Chapman, F
1966–67: Dennis Macks, D
1968–69: Curt Bennett, F
1969–70: Don McGinnis, G
1972–73: Keith Smith, D
1975–76: Kevin McCabe, G; Bill Gilligan, F
1978–79: Mike Mastrullo, D
1989–90: Chris Harvey, G
1990–91: Mike Brewer, D
1991–92: Derek Chauvette, F
1992–93: Scott Hanley, F
1993–94: Chris Kaban, F
1997–98: Jimmy Andersson, D
2001–02: Yann Danis, G
2002–03: Yann Danis, G
2006–07: Sean Hurley, D; Jeff Prough, F
2007–08: Sean Hurley, D
2010–11: Jack Maclellan, F
2011–12: Jack Maclellan, F
2012–13: Matt Lorito, F

Third Team

2009–10: Aaron Volpatti, F
2012–13: Anthony Borelli, G
2013–14: Dennis Robertson, D
2016–17: Sam Lafferty, F
2022–23: Mathieu Caron, G

All-Rookie Team

1989–90: Mike Ross, F
1990–91: Geoff Finch, G
1991–92: Mike Traggio, D
1992–93: Ryan Mulhern, F
1994–95: Jimmy Andersson, D
2003–04: Brian Ihnacak, F
2004–05: Sean Hurley, D
2008–09: Jeff Buvinow, D
2010–11: Dennis Robertson, D
2015–16: Max Gottlieb, D; Tommy Marchin, F

Brown Hall of Fame
The following is a list of Brown's men's ice hockey players who were elected into the Brown University Athletic Hall of Fame (graduating class in parenthesis).

Philip Lingham (1930)
Westcott Moulton (1931)
Alden Walls (1931)
G. Edward Crane (1931)
Jackson Skillings (1937)
Foster Davis Jr. (1939)
George Menard (1950)
Warren Priestly (1951)
Anthony Malo (1951)
Donald Whiston (1951)
 James M Sutherland (Captain)& his entire team of 1950-51 runner up in 1951 NCAA Tournament 
John Gilbert Jr. (1952)
Albert Gubbins (1952)
Jake Murphy (1952)
Donald Sennott (1952)
Bob Wheeler (1952)
Robert Borah (1955)
Daniel Keefe (1955)
S. Russell Kingman Jr. (1956)
Peter Tutless (1956)
F. Rodney Dashnaw (1958)
Harry Batchelder Jr. (1958)
David Kelley (1960)
J. Allan Soares (1960)
Donald Eccleston (1965)
Leon Bryant (1965)
Terry Chapman (1965)
W. Bruce Darling (1966)
David Ferguson (1966)
Robert Gaudreau (1966)
R. Dennis Macks (1967)
Wayne Small (1968)
James Fullerton (1968, honorary)
Robert Devaney (1969)
Donald McGinnis (1970)
Curt Bennett (1970)
Keith Smith (1974)
Bill Gilligan (1977)
Kevin McCabe (1977)
Robert McIntosh (1977)
Tim Bothwell (1978)
James Bennett (1979)
Mike Laycock (1979)
Michael Mastrullo (1979)
Mark Holden (1980)
Christopher Harvey (1990)
Steven King (1991)
Michael Brewer (1992)
Derek Chauvette (1993)
Scott Hanley (1993)
Mike Traggio (1995)
Ryan Mulhern (1996)
Yann Danis (2004)
John Dunham (2011)

Statistical leaders
Source:

Career points leaders

Career goaltending leaders

GP = Games played; Min = Minutes played; GA = Goals against; SO = Shutouts; SV% = Save percentage; GAA = Goals against average

Minimum 10 games

Statistics current through the start of the 2022–23 season.

Roster
As of July 18, 2022.

|}

Bears in the NHL
The following is a list of Brown's men's ice hockey alumni who played in the NHL/WHA.
As of July 1, 2022.

WHA
Several players also were members of WHA teams.

See also
Brown Bears women's ice hockey
Brown Bears

References

External links
 

 
Ice hockey teams in Rhode Island